The 1927 Washington University Bears football team was an American football team that represented Washington University in St. Louis as a member of the Missouri Valley Conference during the 1927 college football season. In its third and final season under head coach Bob Higgins, the team compiled a 5–2–2 record and outscored opponents by a total of 98 to 70. The team played its home games at Francis Field in St. Louis.

Schedule

References

Washington University
Washington University Bears football seasons
Washington University Bears football